This is a list of universities in Anguilla.

Universities 
 Saint James School of Medicine - Anguilla campus
 University of the West Indies - Anguilla campus
 Global Humanistic University AI - First Anguilla Online University

See also 
 List of universities by country

References

Anguilla
Anguilla
Universities